Quietism in philosophy sees the role of philosophy as broadly therapeutic or remedial. Quietist philosophers believe that philosophy has no positive thesis to contribute, but rather that its value is in defusing confusions in the linguistic and conceptual frameworks of other subjects, including non-quietist philosophy. For quietists, advancing knowledge or settling debates (particularly those between realists and non-realists) is not the job of philosophy, rather philosophy should liberate the mind by diagnosing confusing concepts.

Status within philosophy
Crispin Wright said that "Quietism is the view that significant metaphysical debate is impossible." It has been described as "the view or stance that entails avoidance of substantive philosophical theorizing and is usually associated with certain forms of skepticism, pragmatism, and minimalism about truth. More particularly, it is opposed to putting forth positive theses and developing constructive arguments." 

Quietism by its nature is not a philosophical school as understood in the sense of a systematic body of truths.  The objective of quietism is to show that philosophical positions or theories cannot solve problems, settle debates or advance knowledge.

It is often raised in discussion as an opposite position to both philosophical realism and philosophical non-realism. Specifically, quietists deny that there is any substantial debate between the positions of realism and non-realism.  There are a range of justifications for quietism about the realism debate offered by Gideon Rosen and John McDowell.

History and proponents

Ancient 
Pyrrhonism represents perhaps the earliest example of an identifiably quietist position in the West. The Pyrrhonist philosopher Sextus Empiricus described Pyrrhonism as a form of philosophical therapy:

Some have identified Epicureans as another early proponent of quietism.  The goal of Epicurean philosophy is the decidedly quietist objectives of aponia (freedom from pain) and ataraxia, even dismissing Stoic logic as useless.  

The neo-Confucian philosopher Cheng Hao is also associated with advocating quietism.  He argued that the goal of existence should be calming one's natural biases and embracing impartial tranquility. This aversion to bias is nevertheless quite distinct from Wittgenstein's position.

Contemporary  
Contemporary discussion of quietism can be traced back to Ludwig Wittgenstein, whose work greatly influenced the ordinary language philosophers.  While Wittgenstein himself did not advocate quietism, he expressed sympathy with the viewpoint.  One of the early 'ordinary language' works, Gilbert Ryle's The Concept of Mind, attempted to demonstrate that dualism arises from a failure to appreciate that mental vocabulary and physical vocabulary are simply different ways of describing one and the same thing, namely human behaviour. J. L. Austin's Sense and Sensibilia took a similar approach to the problems of skepticism and the reliability of sense perception, arguing that they arise only by misconstruing ordinary language, not because there is anything genuinely wrong with empirical evidence. Norman Malcolm, a friend of Wittgenstein's, took a quietist approach to skeptical problems in the philosophy of mind. 

More recently, the philosophers John McDowell, Irad Kimhi, Sabina Lovibond, Eric Marcus, Gideon Rosen, and to a certain degree Richard Rorty have taken explicitly quietist positions. Pete Mandik has argued for a position of qualia quietism on the hard problem of consciousness.

Varieties 
Some philosophers have advanced quietism about specific subjects such as realism or truth. These positions can be held independent of one's view on quietism about the entire project of philosophy.

On realism 
One may be a realist about a range of subjects within philosophy from ethics and aesthetics to science and mathematics.  Realists claim that a given concept exists, has particular properties and is in some way mind independent, while non-realists deny this claim.  Quietists take a third position, claiming that there is no real debate between realists and non-realists on a given subject.  A version of this position espoused by John McDowell claims that the debate hinges on theses about the relationship between the mind and the world around us that are unsupported or unsupportable, and without those claims there will be no debate.  Others, such as Gideon Rosen argue more specifically against individual cases of the realism debate.

On truth 
Quietism about truth is a version of the identity theory of truth.  Specifically, Jennifer Hornsby and John McDowell argue against any ontological gap between what we think is true and what is actually true.  Quietists about truth resist the distinction between truth bearers and truthmakers as leading to a correspondence theory of truth.  Rather they claim that such a distinction should be eliminated, true statements are simply one thinking truly about the world.  The target of these thoughts is not a truthbearer, but rather the facts of the world themselves.

See also
Philosophical hermeneutics
Critical philosophy
Fictionalism

References

Sources
Wittgenstein, Ludwig. Philosophical Investigations. 3rd Rev Edn, Blackwell, 2002. 
Ryle, Gilbert. The Concept of Mind. London: Hutchinson, 1949. 
Austin, J L. Sense and Sensibilia. OUP, 1962. 
Macarthur, David. “Pragmatism, Metaphysical Quietism and the Problem of Normativity,” Philosophical Topics. Vol.36 No.1, 2009.
Malcolm, Norman. Dreaming (Studies in Philosophical Psychology). Routledge & Kegan Paul, 1959. 
McDowell, John and Evans, Gareth. Truth and Meaning. Oxford: Clarendon Press, 1976. 
McDowell, John. Mind and World. New Ed, Harvard, 1996. 

Metaphysical theories
Theories of language
Philosophical methodology
Psychological attitude
Scientific method
Analytic philosophy